Asarum maximum is a species of plant in the family Aristolochiaceae. It is endemic to China. 
The flowers have a distinct smell of mushrooms.

References

maximum
Flora of China
Vulnerable plants
Taxonomy articles created by Polbot